In mathematics—more specifically, in differential geometry—the musical isomorphism (or canonical isomorphism) is an isomorphism between the tangent bundle  and the cotangent bundle  of a pseudo-Riemannian manifold induced by its metric tensor. There are similar isomorphisms on symplectic manifolds.

In the notation of Ricci calculus, it is also known as raising and lowering indices.

Motivation

In linear algebra, a finite-dimensional vector space is isomorphic to its dual space but not canonically isomorphic to it. On the other hand a finite-dimensional vector space  endowed with a non-degenerate bilinear form , is canonically isomorphic to its dual, the isomorphism being given by:

Musical isomorphisms are the global version of this isomorphism and its inverse, for the tangent bundle and cotangent bundle of a (pseudo-)Riemannian manifold . More generally, musical isomorphisms always exist between a vector bundle endowed with a bundle metric and its dual.

Because every paracompact manifold can be endowed with a Riemannian metric, the musical isomorphisms allow to show that on those spaces a vector bundle is always isomorphic to its dual (but not canonically unless a (pseudo-)Riemannian metric has been associated with the manifold).

Discussion
Let  be a pseudo-Riemannian manifold. Suppose  is a moving tangent frame (see also smooth frame) for the tangent bundle  with, as dual frame (see also dual basis), the moving coframe (a moving tangent frame for the cotangent bundle ; see also coframe) .

Given a vector field  and denoting , we define its flat by

This is referred to as lowering an index.

In the same way, given a covector field  and denoting , we define its sharp by

where  are the components of the inverse metric tensor (given by the entries of the inverse matrix to ). Taking the sharp of a covector field is referred to as raising an index. In angle bracket notation, this reads

for any covector field  and any vector field .

Through this construction, we have two mutually inverse isomorphisms

Extension to tensor products
The musical isomorphisms may also be extended to the bundles

Which index is to be raised or lowered must be indicated. For instance, consider the -tensor field . Raising the second index, we get the -tensor field

Extension to k-vectors and k-forms

defined by

In this extension, in which  maps p-vectors to p-covectors and  maps p-covectors to p-vectors, all the indices of a totally antisymmetric tensor are simultaneously raised or lowered, and so no index need be indicated:

Trace of a tensor through a metric tensor
Given a type  tensor field , we define the trace of  through the metric tensor  by

Observe that the definition of trace is independent of the choice of index to raise, since the metric tensor is symmetric.

See also 
Duality (mathematics)
Raising and lowering indices

Hodge star operator
Vector bundle
Flat (music) and Sharp (music) about the signs  and

Citations

References 
 
 
 

Differential geometry
Riemannian geometry
Riemannian manifolds
Symplectic geometry